This is a list of settlements in Surrey by population based on the results of the 2011 census. The next United Kingdom census will take place in 2021. In 2011, there were 36 built-up area subdivisions with 5,000 or more inhabitants in Surrey, shown in the table below.

Administrative boundaries

Population ranking

See also 

 Surrey

References

External links
 Link to ONS built up area statistics

 
Surrey
Surrey